The communauté de communes du Berry charentonnais was created on December 29, 1999 and was located in the Cher département of the Centre region of France. It was created in January 2000. It was merged into the Communauté de communes du Cœur de France in January 2013.

The Communauté de communes comprised the following communes:

 Arpheuilles
 Bannegon
 Bessais-le-Fromental
 Charenton-du-Cher
 Coust
 Le Pondy
 Saint-Pierre-les-Étieux
 Thaumiers
 Vernais

References 

Berry charentonnais